Eugnosta rufocentra is a species of moth of the family Tortricidae. It is found in Brazil (Goias, Distrito Federal).

The wingspan is about 15 mm. The ground colour of the forewings is white with some refractive
Marks and delicate grey and brownish strigulae. There are brownish spots along the costa. The hindwings are white-grey, strigulated with brownish grey.

References

Moths described in 2002
Eugnosta